Michael Davis (born 24 June 1940) is a British rower. He competed in the men's eight event at the 1960 Summer Olympics.

References

1940 births
Living people
British male rowers
Olympic rowers of Great Britain
Rowers at the 1960 Summer Olympics
People from Arundel